Draconibacterium is a genus of bacteria from the family of Prolixibacteraceae.

References

Bacteroidia
Bacteria genera
Taxa described in 2014